İzmir Province is a province and metropolitan municipality of Turkey in western Anatolia, situated along the Aegean coast. Its capital is the city of İzmir, which is in itself composed of the province's central 11 districts out of 30 in total. To the west, it is surrounded by the Aegean Sea, and it encloses the Gulf of Izmir. The population was 3,370,866 in 2000. Neighboring provinces are Balıkesir to the north, Manisa to the east, and Aydın to the south. The traffic code of the province is 35.

Major rivers of the province include the Küçük Menderes river, Koca Çay (with Güzelhisar dam), and Bakırçay.

Districts 

 Aliağa
 Balçova
 Bayındır
 Bayraklı
 Bergama
 Beydağ
 Bornova
 Buca
 Çeşme
 Çiğli
 Dikili
 Foça 
 Gaziemir
 İzmir
 Karabağlar
 Karaburun
 Karşıyaka
 Konak
 Kemalpaşa
 Kınık
 Kiraz
 Menderes 
 Menemen
 Narlidere 
 Ödemiş
 Seferihisar 
 Selçuk
 Tire
 Torbalı
 Urla

Demographics

History

It is one of the oldest cities and ports of ancient Ionia in the Mediterranean Sea. It was founded around 3000 BC and has survived to this day. It was inhabited by Greek populations from antiquity until the destruction of Smyrna in 1922 and the exchange of populations that followed with the Treaty of Lausanne. In its long history it has changed location twice. The first location (prehistoric times) was mentioned by Strabo as "Old Smyrna" and the second location was built by Alexander the Great and his descendants (Hellenistic period). Ionians, in about 11th century BC, established the League of Ionia. It was later conquered by the Persians and retaken by the Greeks before being subsumed into the Roman Empire. In Roman times it became very prosperous and the Romans honored it three times with the praiseworthy title of "young girl" because of its amazing prosperity. Izmir was not the first city to recognize Rome as a deity. The term "Catholic Church" was first used in 110 in a letter from St. Ignatius of Antioch to the Church of Smyrna. After the split of the Roman Empire, the area became part of what is now called the Byzantine Empire until it was conquered by the Ottoman Turks in the 14th century. In 1424, Smyrna was conquered by the Ottomans. However, before and after its occupation, Venetians and Genoese tried several times to include it in their Republics. On September 13, 1472, the Venetians, under Pietro Mokenigo,  captured and destroyed the city, in a failed attempt. Following the First World War, the province was ceded to Greece, but was retaken by the forces of Mustafa Kemal Atatürk in the Turkish War of Independence. As a result of the Treaty of Lausanne (1923), all Greek Orthodox inhabitants of the province were deported, and İzmir Province was incorporated into the modern republic of Turkey.

An earthquake on 30 October 2020 killed 117 people in the area.

Archaeology 

In January 2021, archaeologists headed by Elif Koparal, announced the discovery of the ruins of a 2500 year-old temple of Aphrodite from the 5th century BC in the Urla-Çeşme peninsula. Among other findings in and around the temple, they found a statue piece depicting a woman, a terracotta female head and an inscription that reads, "This is the sacred area". The traces of the temple were first excavated in 2016.

Wind power generation 
"The greater Izmir region produces 20% of Turkey’s wind power from wind turbines capable of generating more than 1,300 megawatts (MW)."

See also
List of populated places in İzmir Province
 2020 Aegean Sea earthquake

References

External links

  İzmir governor's official website
 İzmir metropolitan municipality's official website
  Directorate of Culture and Tourism in İzmir
  Local administrations in İzmir
 İzmir weather forecast information